Florence Donald Shapiro (born May 2, 1948) is an American politician from Texas, a Republican former member of the Texas Senate. From 1993 to 1995, she represented the 2nd District and from 1995 to 2013, the 8th District, which includes several cities, towns, and other outlying areas of the Dallas–Fort Worth Metroplex.

Shapiro previously served as Senate State Affairs Committee chair and since 2003 has chaired the Senate Education Committee. Her series of bills known as Ashley's Laws, which severely punishes sexual predators, quickly became national benchmarks in the fight against sex offenders. Shapiro's work earned her the Texas Association Against Sexual Assault's "Champion for Social Change Award". and the Children's Advocacy Centers of Texas's "Legislator of the Year Award" in 2008.

President George W. Bush appointed her to serve on the Honorary Delegation to accompany him to Jerusalem for the celebration of the 60th anniversary of the State of Israel in May 2008.

Personal life
A first-generation American and the daughter of two Holocaust survivors, Florence Shapiro was born in New York City. After the family moved to Dallas, Texas, she attended and graduated from Hillcrest High School. After high school, Shapiro matriculated to The University of Texas at Austin, the first in her family to attend college,
and graduated with a B.S. in secondary education. Shapiro began her professional career as a public school English and speech teacher for the Richardson Independent School District in Richardson, Texas. Shapiro also founded Shapiro & Company, an advertising, public relations and special events agency. She lives in Plano, Texas with her husband Howard; they have three children, Lisa Strauss of Houston, Todd Shapiro of Frisco, Texas, and Staci Rubin of Plano, and 12 grandchildren.

Political career

Local politics
Florence Shapiro entered politics after being elected to be a member of the Plano City Council, where she served six terms from 1979 to 1990. Shapiro was subsequently elected Mayor of Plano and served from 1990 to 1992. During this time, Shapiro was the President of the Texas Municipal League and the North Texas Council of Governments.

Texas Senate
Florence Shapiro was first elected to the Texas Senate in 1992, after defeating Democratic incumbent Ted Lyon, serving since 1993. In January 2005, she was elected President pro tempore of the State Senate, becoming second in the gubernatorial line of succession, behind the Lieutenant Governor of Texas. She was the first senator from Collin County to serve in that position in more than forty years. When both Governor Rick Perry and Lieutenant Governor David Dewhurst were out of the state on official business on April 9, 2005, Shapiro served as the Governor for a day, the sixth woman in Texas history to do so.

U.S. Senate campaign speculation

Due to her friendship with Senator Kay Bailey Hutchison, it was widely speculated that Shapiro would run for Hutchison's seat upon her resignation for her own gubernatorial run against Rick Perry. On July 15, 2008, Shapiro announced the formation of an exploratory committee for U.S. Senate, the first candidate to do so. It was chaired by former Dallas Cowboys quarterback Roger Staubach. Since the formation of the committee, Shapiro began heavy fundraising, both in Texas and out-of-state, and by the end of 2008, had raised more money than any other declared candidate, to date the highest of any declared Republican. Shapiro raised $226,000 in the fourth quarter of 2008 and ended the year with $373,556 in the bank. Early polls indicated Shapiro defeating former Texas State Comptroller John Sharp, but trailing current Houston mayor Bill White in head-to-head matchups.

However, in January 2011, she decided against continuing a campaign for United States Senate. Saying that she is "committed to serving in the Texas State Senate now and in the future."

Retirement from Texas Senate

In September 2011, Shapiro announced that she would not be a candidate for reelection.  Republican former State Representative Tony Goolsby indicated that he would seek to succeed Shapiro, as did the military officer Scott O'Grady, but neither ran for the seat. Shapiro was instead succeeded in the Senate by fellow Republican Ken Paxton.

Election history

2006

2002

2000

1996

1994

1992

References

External links

Committees

Official Facebook Page
 
Follow the Money - Florence Shapiro
2006 2004 2002 2000 campaign contributions

1948 births
Living people
American marketing people
Jewish mayors of places in the United States
Jewish women politicians
Marketing women
Mayors of Plano, Texas
People from Plano, Texas
Presidents pro tempore of the Texas Senate
Republican Party Texas state senators
University of Texas at Austin College of Education alumni
Women mayors of places in Texas
Women state legislators in Texas
21st-century American politicians
21st-century American women politicians
Jewish American state legislators in Texas
21st-century American Jews